Sam McClelland (born 4 January 2002) is a Northern Irish professional football player who plays for the Northern Ireland national team and Barrow, on loan from Chelsea.

Club career 

McClelland began his youth career playing for Limavady Youths before moving to the Coleraine Academy. He made his Chelsea U18 debut against Arsenal in September 2018 and signed his first professional contract in July 2019.

On 23 June 2022, he signed on a year long loan for League Two side Barrow. McClelland made his debut on 30 July, starting in a 3–2 away win against Stockport County. He scored his first career goal in a 2–1 win over Walsall on 16 August 2022.

International career 
McClelland made his international debut for Northern Ireland on 3 June 2021 against Ukraine in a friendly.

Career statistics

Club

References

External links

2002 births
Living people
Association footballers from Northern Ireland
Northern Ireland international footballers
Association football defenders
People from Coleraine, County Londonderry
Chelsea F.C. players
Barrow A.F.C. players
English Football League players
Sportspeople from County Londonderry